The Halaf culture is a prehistoric period which lasted between about 6100 BC and 5100 BC. The period is a continuous development out of the earlier Pottery Neolithic and is located primarily in the fertile valley of the Khabur River (Nahr al-Khabur), of south-eastern Turkey, Syria, and northern Iraq, although Halaf-influenced material is found throughout Greater Mesopotamia.

While the period is named after the site of Tell Halaf in north Syria, excavated by Max von Oppenheim between 1911 and 1927, the earliest Halaf period material was excavated by John Garstang in 1908 at the site of Sakce Gözü, then in Syria but now part of Turkey. Small amounts of Halaf material were also excavated in 1913 by Leonard Woolley at Carchemish, on the Turkish/Syrian border. However, the most important site for the Halaf tradition was the site of Tell Arpachiyah, now located in the suburbs of Mosul, Iraq.

The Halaf period was succeeded by the Halaf-Ubaid Transitional period, which comprised the late Halaf (c. 5400–5000 BC), and then by the Ubaid period.

Origin

Previously, the Syrian plains were not considered as the homeland of Halaf culture, and the Halafians were seen either as hill people who descended from the nearby mountains of southeastern Anatolia, or herdsmen from northern Iraq. However, those views changed with the recent archaeology conducted since 1986 by Peter Akkermans, which have produced new insights and perspectives about the rise of Halaf culture. A formerly unknown transitional culture between the pre-Halaf Neolithic's era and Halaf's era was uncovered in the Balikh valley, at Tell Sabi Abyad (the Mound of the White Boy).

Currently, eleven occupational layers have been unearthed in Sabi Abyad. Levels from 11 to 7 are considered pre-Halaf; from 6 to 4, transitional; and from 3 to 1, early Halaf. No hiatus in occupation is observed except between levels 11 and 10. The new archaeology demonstrated that Halaf culture was not sudden and was not the result of foreign people, but rather a continuous process of indigenous cultural changes in northern Syria that spread to the other regions.

Culture

Architecture

Halaf pottery
Halaf pottery has been found in other parts of northern Mesopotamia, such as at Nineveh and Tepe Gawra, Chagar Bazar, Tell Amarna and at many sites in Anatolia (Turkey) suggesting that it was widely used in the region.

Stamp seals
The Halaf culture saw the earliest known appearance of stamp seals in the Near East. They featured essentially geometric patterns.

Halaf's end (Northern Ubaid)
Halaf culture ended by 5000 BC after entering the so-called Halaf-Ubaid Transitional period. Many Halafian settlements were abandoned, and the remaining ones showed Ubaidian characters. The new period is named Northern Ubaid to distinguish it from the proper Ubaid in southern Mesopotamia, and two explanations were presented for the transformation. The first maintains an invasion and a replacement of the Halafians by the Ubaidians; however, there is no hiatus between the Halaf and northern Ubaid which exclude the invasion theory. The most plausible theory is a Halafian adoption of the Ubaid culture, which is supported by most scholars, including Oates, Breniquet, and Akkermans.

See also
Samarra culture

References

Citations

Bibliography

External links

Halaf culture The Metropolitan Museum of Art
Halaf Bowl from Arpachiyah - British Museum

 
Archaeological cultures of West Asia
Neolithic cultures of Asia
Archaeological cultures in Iraq
Archaeological cultures in Syria
Archaeological cultures in Turkey
Prehistoric Syria